The Police National Computer (PNC) is a database used by law enforcement organisations across the United Kingdom and other Non-Law Enforcement Agencies. Originally developed in the early 1970s, PNC1  went 'live' in 1974 providing UK police forces with online access to the Lost/Stolen vehicle database. The vehicle owners application quickly followed giving the police online access to the names/addresses of every vehicle owner in the UK.  The Police National Computer started holding nominal information based on the computerisation of criminal records held by the Metropolitan Police and other police forces in the late 1970s. These CRO records could be accessed online in real-time by all UK police forces via the "Names" applications. The PNC now consists of several databases available 24 hours a day, giving access to information of national and local matters. As of 18 January 2021, Kit Malthouse said that there are 13 million person records, 58.5 million driver records, and 62.6 million vehicle records stored on the PNC. The PNC is currently directly managed by the Home Office. Between 2007 and 2012, it was maintained by the National Policing Improvement Agency (NPIA) which inherited the activities of the now disbanded Police Information Technology Organisation (PITO).

History 
Since its inception in 1974, the PNC has undergone numerous changes that were gradually introduced. The most notable was the introduction of the Phoenix (Police and Home Office Enhanced Names Index) in 1995. This format has been retained to the present day.

The PNC is based on a Fujitsu BS2000/OSD SE700 mainframe with recent PNC applications held on UNIX servers. There are around 26,000 directly connected terminals and 25,000 terminals which are connected via local police force computer systems. The mainframe is connected to the end user by a multitude of ways, for high volume users (i.e. other police forces) via secure IP network, for low volume users a secure dial-up link provided by Cable & Wireless. Another connection method is via an X.25 packet-switched network; this method is being phased out. Databases for vehicles and driver licences are copied from the DVLA databases in the early morning (there is no service loss when an update is in progress). The mainframe server is located at the Hendon Data Centre with back-up servers located around the UK.

In 2005 the only back-up server was located next to Hertfordshire Oil Storage Terminal in Buncefield, which was the scene of a major civil emergency when it burned to the ground in December 2005.

Users

Requests for access to PNC are decided upon by the PNC Information Access Panel (PIAP). The members of the panel are the National Police Chiefs' Council (NPCC), the Association of Police Authorities, and the Home Office. Delegated or subcontracted users exist.

Organisations with full access:

 All territorial police forces of Great Britain
 Police Service of Northern Ireland (PSNI)
 British Transport Police (BTP)
 Civil Nuclear Constabulary
 Isle of Man Constabulary
 States of Jersey Police
 States of Guernsey Police Service
 National Identification Service (NIS)
 National Crime Agency (NCA)
 Serious Fraud Office (SFO)
 Ministry of Defence Police (MDP)
 HM Revenue & Customs
 The Security Service (MI5)
 Secret Intelligence Service (MI6)
 Government Communications Headquarters (GCHQ)
 Defence Intelligence Staff
 Department for Work and Pensions
 National Police Chiefs' Council (NPCC)

Other organisations have restricted access to names file only. 

HM Court Service
Probation Service
The Criminal Records Bureau
The Royal Military Police
Royal Air Force Police
Royal Navy Police
Royal Marines Police

PIAP has defined the following organisations as non-police and has agreed that authorised users within these organisations can have Names file only access commensurate with their previously stated and agreed business needs.

Non-police organisations with access to PNC:

Databases
PNC contains several separate databases; these include:

 Names File: This contains a large amount of information about people who have been convicted, cautioned or recently arrested (referred to as 'nominals' on the PNC). This includes links to fingerprints and DNA. (The PNC is a text only computer so no graphical information is stored; photos that are taken whilst in custody have information relating to their location so enquiries can be made to obtain a copy of them). Nominals can be placed on the PNC as 'Wanted/Missing' if they are sought in connection with a crime, on warrant and failed to appear at court, AWOL from military service or reported missing. All recent previous arrests and convictions will appear on PNC as well as any impending offences; full disposal history is also included which will show the sentence handed down for each offence. Numerous other items of information are also stored including all previous addresses, co-defendants, local intelligence, marks/scars and descriptions.
 Vehicle File: Provides details on the registered keeper of a motor vehicle, as well as storing other information from the DVLA as to the vehicle's status (Tax Expired, V23 Submitted, Stolen, Chassis Number, Engine Number etc.). Certain reports can be added by the police which relate to the vehicle or occupant status; examples include if the occupants are believed to be involved in crime or are missing, if the vehicle is stolen, if the vehicle is believed to be cloned etc. The vehicle record system is currently linked to the Motor Insurance Database (maintained by the Motor Insurers Bureau) which can confirm if an insurance policy is on the vehicle and the details of such policy such as named drivers, policy dates, policy number and insurance company. The Vehicle Operator Services Agency (VOSA) have computerised the MOT; as a result, a link has been created to the PNC which shows the expiration date of the MOT tests for vehicles. The vehicle file actually contains two separate databases (that show on a single screen), one of which is updated and controlled by the DVLA, and the second part is the responsibility of the police (including vehicle reports, which the DVLA do not have access to).
 Property File: Certain types of stolen and found property can be placed onto the PNC system. These are recorded under the following categories: Trailers (including sidecars), Plant (non-DVLA-registered agricultural and construction machinery), Engines (those that do not fall under other categories), Animal (registered animals), Marine Craft, and Firearms (including imitation firearms).
 Drivers File: This recently added database contains information on 48 million people who either hold a driving licence or are disqualified from holding one. The record will contain information relating to test passes, endorsements and the licence entitlements. This database is the responsibility of the DVLA and is updated every morning.

PNC operators undergo initial training to operate the system which usually consists of a five-day course to view data and conduct simple queries. Further courses are available to expand the user's access level to update and conduct more in-depth queries. Penalties for misuse of the PNC and unlawful access of data are severe; it will likely lead to dismissal and sometimes a court appearance for breaching the Data Protection Act 1998.

A number of criminal justice partners are linked to the PNC, giving them access to the information held on the computer. About 5,000 checks are made each week through the ‘Jurors’ link, which allows Crown Courts to check whether a proposed juror has a criminal record. Previously, the Courts Service struggled to meet its target of randomly checking 20 per cent of potential jury members.

With the growth of trans-national criminality, the PNC was linked to the Schengen Information System (SIS) which shares certain information Europe-wide. This is no longer the case since the UK left the European Union in 2020.

The Police National Computer is one of the main sources of information accessed when a Disclosure and Barring Service check is made. The Police National Computer holds indefinite records of a person's convictions and cautions which will be revealed in a Disclosure and Barring Service check. While of use in informing prospective employers as to the suitability of an applicant for a particular job, the information disclosed can show information which the applicant may think is of no relevance, such as a juvenile conviction for shoplifting where the applicant is now a thirty-year-old individual and applying for a job in a bank. Concerns have been expressed that the indefinite retention of old convictions and cautions is unwarranted.

Because of changes to legislation on 29 May 2013 DBS removed certain specified old and minor offences from criminal record certificates issued from this date. The filtering rules and the list of offences that will never be filtered are available on the DBS website.

A major data loss was discovered in January 2021, and a UK Home Office press release provides information on the extent of the loss and the work to restore the data.

Impact Nominal Index
In 2002 IMPACT delivered a tactical, complementary service to the PNC, called the Impact Nominal Index (INI).

Police National Database
Delivery of the PND (Police National Database) was the first recommendation of the Bichard report commenced in May 2010 when the first forces began to load their data on to the new system. In November 2010, Northumbria Police became the first force to connect to the PND and to begin to use the new system. As from June 2011, all Home Office forces were connected and using the PND.

PND is not a replacement for PNC, instead captures data from over 200 different systems from 51 contributing police forces and law enforcement agencies.

The system currently holds over 3.5 billion searchable records, and is operated by the Canadian company CGI Group, on behalf of the Home Office.

CGI bought out the original PND operators Logica in 2012.

The future of the PNC 
In 2016 it was announced that the PNC would be decommissioned at the same time as the PND contract expired in 2019 and under the guise of the National Law Enforcement Data Programme, a replacement would combine both systems; for the first time merging intelligence and conviction history against one nominal record. The National Law Enforcement Data Service would provide a less police-centric platform servicing all public enforcement agencies ranging from the Border Force, HM Revenue and Customs, the Driver and Vehicle Licensing Agency and the Charity Commission.

In order to ensure that only relevant data is visible to each agency, user-based access controls will limit the segments of records which an agency can access to the very minimum they require to achieve their aims.

Public right of access 

Any person now has the right to view their PNC record, if any, online or via post, for free at www.acro.police.uk. This is done online where the user presents a list of their addresses for the previous 10 years and an upload of an ID document but this can also be presented offline. The results can be sent either by post or via email.

This data is separate to any data a local force may hold on an individual e.g. statements, summons files, traffic fixed penalties, etc. This information can be requested through the relevant local force through a Subject Access Request under the Data Protection Act 2018.

See also
Crimint
United Kingdom National DNA Database
National Ballistics Intelligence Service
Aerial roof markings
Canadian Police Information Centre, Canadian equivalent law enforcement database
National Crime Information Center, American equivalent of the PNC

References

External links
ACRO PNC services
 National Policing Improvement Agency
 Civica web PNC information - includes example screens (PDF file)
 NDI Technologies - over 85% of UK law-enforcement agencies connect to the PNC with NDI
 UK Gov. publications about filtering rules for criminal record checks
 UK Gov. publication about offences never filtered from a criminal record check

Biometric databases
Criminal records
Government databases in the United Kingdom
Law enforcement databases
Law enforcement in the United Kingdom
Organisations based in the London Borough of Barnet